Andal, also known as Kothai, Nachiyar, and Godadevi, was the only female Alvar among the twelve Hindu poet-saints of South India. She was posthumously considered an avatar of the goddess Bhudevi. As with the Alvar saints, she was affiliated to the Sri Vaishnava tradition of Hinduism. Active in the 8th-century, with some suggesting 7th-century, Andal is credited with two great Tamil works, Thiruppavai and Nachiyar Tirumoḻi, which are still recited by devotees during the winter festival season of Margaḻi. Andal is a prominent figure for women in South India and has inspired several women's groups such as Goda Mandali.

Legends 

According to literary and religious tradition, Periyalvar (பெரியாழ்வார்), originally called Vishnuchithan, was an ardent devotee of Perumal (Vishnu) and he used to string garlands to the deity every day. He was childless and he prayed to God to save him from the longing for a child. One day, he found a girl under a Tulasi plant in a garden inside the temple. The child was considered to be the goddess Bhudevi herself. He named the child as Kothai, who grew up as a devotee of Krishna, an avatar of Vishnu. She is believed to have worn the garland before dedicating it to the presiding deity of the temple. Periyalvar, who later found it, was highly upset and remonstrated her. Vishnu appeared in his dream and asked him to dedicate only the garland worn by Andal to him because when the new garland was put on Vishnu's idol, it fell down but when the garland was worn by Andal, Vishnu turned into gold. The girl Kothai was thus named Andal and was referred to as "Chudikodutha Sudarkodi" (சூடிகொடுத்த சுடர்க்கொடி), meaning the lady who wore and gave her garland to Vishnu. Periyalvar took Andal to the Ranganathaswamy Temple in Srirangam and Andal was reunited with Vishnu as his bride. The practice is followed during modern times when the garland of Andal from Srivilliputhur Andal Temple is sent to Tirumala Venkateswara Temple on Garudotsavam during the Tamil month of Purattaasi (September – October) and Azhagar Koyil during Chitra Pournami. Andal is also called as Nachiyar or Andalnachiar.

Kodhai was brought up by Vishnuchitta (Periyalvar) in an atmosphere of love and devotion. As Kodhai grew into a beautiful maiden, her fervor for God grew to the extent that she decided to marry only God himself. As time passed, her resolve strengthened and she thought constantly about marrying Ranganathar of Thiruvarangam (the reclining form of Vishnu). Andal is referred to as Nachiyar. She wrote Thiruppavai and Nachiyar Thirumoḻi.

In Tamil Nadu, Andal is remembered for her pure love and devotion. In the Thiruppavai, Andal, as a Gopi in Ayarpadi (Vrindavan), emphasizes that the ultimate goal of life is to seek surrender and refuge at the Lord's feet. It is believed that Ranganatha of Ranganathaswamy temple married Andal, who later merged with the idol. Since Andal married Ranganatha, the presiding deity is called Rangamannar.

Iconography 
Andal's hairstyle and ornamentation are unique to ancient Tamil culture. The tuft of the hair is bunned to the side and adorned with jasmine flowers and elaborate jewellery.

Srivilliputhur Andal's hand-crafted parrot is made with fresh green leaves each and every day. This parrot is kept in the left hand of Andal. It takes approximately four and half hours to make this parrot. A pomegranate flower for beak and mouth, Bamboo sticks for legs, banana plant, petals of pink oleander and nandiyavattai are used to prepare this parrot.

Literary works
Andal composed two literary works, both of which are in the rich Tamil verse form and express literary, philosophical, religious, and aesthetic content.

Thiruppavai
Her first work is the Thiruppavai, a collection of 30 verses in which Andal imagines herself to be a gopi, one of the cowherd girls known for their unconditional devotion to Krishna. In Thiruppavai, Andal idolized Radha as the ideal gopi and also invoked the gopis of Braj. Nappinai is identified as a form of Lakshmi, who is accorded the status of the supreme consort of Vishnu in Sri Vaishnavism. In these verses, she describes the yearning to serve Vishnu and achieve happiness not just in one lifetime, but for all eternity. She also describes the religious vows (pavai) that she and her fellow cowherd girls will observe for this purpose. It is said that Thiruppavai is the nectar of Vedas and teaches philosophical values, moral values, ethical values, pure love, devotion, dedication, single-minded aim, virtues, and the ultimate goal of life.

Andal extols Krishna thus in this text:

Nachiyar Tirumoḻi 
The second work by Andal is the Nachiyar Tirumoḻi, a poem of 143 verses. "Tirumoḻi" literally means "Sacred Sayings" in a Tamil poetic style and "Nachiyar" means Goddess. Therefore, the title means "Sacred Sayings of the Goddess." This poem fully reveals Andal's intense longing for Vishnu, the Divine Beloved. Utilising classical Tamil poetic conventions and interspersing stories from the Vedas and Puranas, Andal creates imagery that is possibly unparalleled in the whole gamut of Indian religious literature.

In Nachiyar Tirumoḻi, Andal craves for God and says she would offer God a 1000 pots of "akkaravadisal" if he marries her, which was later fulfilled by Saint Ramanuja in the 11th century.

Nevertheless, conservative Vaishnava institutions do not encourage the propagation of Nachiyar Tirumoḻi as much as they encourage Thiruppavai because Nachiyar Tirumoḻi belongs to an erotic genre of spirituality that is similar to Jayadeva's Gita Govinda.

Significance in Southern India 
 
Andal is one of the reputed poet-saints of the Tamils. Pious tradition holds her to be the incarnation of Bhūmi Devi (Sri Lakshmi as Mother Earth) to show humanity the way to Vishnu's lotus feet. In Southern India, representation of her next to Vishnu are present in Vaishnava temples, many temples also have a separate shrine for Andal. During the month of Margaḻi, discourses on the Thiruppavai in Tamil, Telugu, Kannada, and Hindi take place all over India. The Srivilliputhur Divya Desam at Srivilliputhur consists of twin temples, one of which is dedicated to Andal. There are a number of festivals dedicated to Andal, among the most notable being the Pavai Nonbu in the Tamil month of Margaḻi (December – January), Andal Thirukalyanam in Panguni, Pagalpathu, Rapathu, Adi Thiruviḻa, when Andal is depicted seated in the lap of Ranganathar. Andal is known for her unwavering devotion to Vishnu, the preserver deity.  Adopted by her father, Periyalvar, Andal avoided earthly marriage, the normal and expected path for women of her culture, to marry Vishnu, both spiritually and physically. In many places in India, particularly in Tamil Nadu, Andal is treated more than a saint and as a form of god herself and a shrine for Andal is dedicated in several Vishnu temples.

Thousands of people from the state Tamil Nadu participate in the "Aadi Pooram" festival celebrated in the Andal Temple. After early morning special pujaas, the presiding deities, Shri Rengamannar and Goddess Andal are taken in decorated palanquins to the car. The festival marks the adoption of presiding deity, Andal, by Periyalvar after he found her near a Tulsi plant in the garden of Vatapatrasayi Temple at Srivilliputhur on the eighth day of the Tamil month of Aadi.
For Tirupati Brahmotsavam, garlands worn to Andal in Srivilliputhur temple are sent to Venkateswara Temple at Tirupati in Andhra Pradesh. These traditional garlands are made of tulasi, sevanthi and sampangi flowers. These garlands are worn by Venkateswara during the Garuda seva procession.
Every year, Tirupati Venkateswara's garland is sent to Srivilliputtur Andal for marriage festival of Andal.
Andal garland is also sent to Madurai Kallaḻagar temple for the Chithirai Festival.

In poetry, 9th-century Andal became a well known Bhakti movement poetess, states Pintchman, and historical records suggest that by 12th-century she was a major inspiration to Hindu women in south India and elsewhere. Andal continues to inspire hundreds of classical dancers in modern times choreographing and dancing Andal's songs. Andal is also called Goda, and her contributions to the arts have created Goda Mandali (circle of Andal) in the Vaishnava tradition.

Through poetry of saints (such as Andal) women are thought to be able to connect with God directly and those words are thought to encapsulate their personal emotions.

Goda Mandali (circle) which was named after Andal was formed in 1970 and reorganized in 1982 spreads Andal songs widely through TV and radio programs. The group would gather weekly to learn songs and would sing at events such as festivals where they would raise money for shrines.

Influence on Contemporary world

Bhakti Poetry 
In contemporary commentaries on Tamil bhakti poetry, A.K. Ramanujan's work remarks on how many other religious traditions would keep and treat passionate love and devotion to God as separate, while in the bhakti tradition, they can be in resonance with one another:

"All devotional poetry plays on the tension between saguna and nirguna, God as person and God as principle. If he were entirely a person, he would not be divine, and if he were entirely a principle, a godhead, one could not make poems about him. 
The Vaishnavas, too, say that God is characterized by both 'paratva, 'otherness' and soulabhaya, 'ease of access'; he is both here and beyond, both tangible as a person and intangible as a principle-such is the nature of the ground of all being. It is not either/or, but both and; myth, bhakti and poetry would be impossible without the presence of both attitudes".

Feminist Interpretations 
Several contemporary interpretations view her act of marrying Vishnu as feminist. Divine marriages and virginity allowed women's subjectivity, as she is able to choose her husband, and given an "aristocratic freedom".  It is said that by devoting herself to God and rejecting marrying a human, she avoided the regular duties involved with being a wife that would inhibit her freedom.

In one of her poems, Andal says that her voluptuous heart will swell for God alone, and scorns the idea of making love to mortal beings, comparing that with the sacrificial offering made by Brahmins being violated by jackals in the forest, and in another verse she dedicates her swelling breasts to God who carries a conch.

Feminist interpretations look at some of Andal's verses as her open acknowledgement of her love for Vishnu, written with bold sensuality and startlingly savage longing, hunger and inquiry as widely found in Tamil Sangam literature that express women's longings and their separation from their men; even today, her most erotic poems are rarely rendered publicly. In one such verse Andal dispenses with metaphor and imagines herself lying in the arms of Krishna, making love to him:

My life will be spared 
Only if he will come 
To stay for me for one night 
If he will enter me, 
So as to leave 
the imprint of his saffron paste 
upon my breasts 
 
Mixing, churning, maddening me inside, 
Gathering my swollen ripeness 
Spilling nectar,
 
As my body and blood 
Bursts into flower.	 William Dalrymple- In search of Tamil Nadu's poet-preachers

Quoted from Feminism and world religions by Arvind Sharma, Katherine K. Young: "What Andal and other women poets did by living the way they did was to negotiate a space within a marriage-dominated society and made at least some sections of society make room for them".

Andal fulfilled the expectation of becoming a wife by marrying God, but since her husband was divine, she gained her autonomy. This act is referred to as virginal feminism by numerous scholars in patristic theology. Virginity is viewed as giving women the option to avoid childbearing, "male domination" and live a new life of devotion to God.

Amuktamalyada

Krishnadevaraya of the Vijayanagar Dynasty composed the epic poem Amuktamalyada in Telugu, which is considered as a masterpiece. Amuktamalyada translates to one who wears and gives away garlands, and describes the story of Andal or Goda Devi, the daughter of Periyalvar.

Amuktamalyada describes pain of separation (viraha) experienced by Andal, who is described as the incarnate of Lakshmi the consort of Vishnu. Further the poem describes Andal's beauty in 30 verses written in the keśādi-pādam style, starting from her hair, going down her body till her feet.

Mangalasasanam
Mangalasasanam by Divyadesam: Andal has sung in praise of eleven holy sites:

Notes

References

External links
Andal's Thirupavai meaning in English
Andal's Varanam Aayiram

 
 http://www.advaita.org.uk/discourses/teachers/andal_marvelly.htm

Alvars
Hindu female religious leaders
Tamil deities
Bhakti movement
Vaishnava saints
Women mystics
Tamil Hindu saints
Dalit Hindu saints
7th-century Hindus
8th-century Hindus